is a Japanese professional futsal club, currently playing in the F. League Division 1. The team is located in Ōita, Ōita prefecture, Japan. Their home arena is Oozu Sports Park.

History

External links 

Futsal clubs in Japan
Ōita (city)
Futsal clubs established in 2003
2003 establishments in Japan